The Iulia Hasdeu National College is a high school located in the east part of Bucharest, Romania, right at the crossroad of Ferdinand I Boulevard and Mihai Bravu Highway. It is one of the most prestigious secondary education institutions in Bucharest. It was named after poet Iulia Hasdeu.

See also 
 Iulia Hasdeu

External links 
 Official site

High schools in Bucharest
National Colleges in Romania